The New York Ripper murders refer to the murders of two children on the East Side of Manhattan, New York, U.S, between March and May 1915. Both victims, a boy and a girl, were stabbed to death in the hallways of tenements. Letters signed "Jack the Ripper" were sent to the mothers of the victims. The writer of the letters boasted that he would never be caught and threatened to murder more children. Despite numerous suspects being arrested in connection to the crimes, all were eventually cleared, and the murders remain unsolved.

Murders

Leonore Cohn 
On the evening of March 19, 1915, at about 7:30 p.m., Anna Cohn sent her daughter, 5-year-old Leonore Cohn, to buy a pail of milk at the store. Ten minutes later, as she was walking back up the stairs to her apartment building, she was choked unconscious, stabbed multiple times with a keen-edged knife, and mutilated. At 7:45 p.m., her neighbor, Augusta Johnson, found her after she heard whimpering from outside of her door. Cohn was still alive when she was found, but died soon after an ambulance surgeon arrived at the residence.

Investigators examining the crime scene noticed that Cohn had clutched a clump of gray hair in her left hand before her death. They also noticed the bruise marks on Cohn's neck indicated that the perpetrator had a large hand. As police searched the apartment building, they discovered blood droplets on two steps of another staircase, on the opposite side of the tenement, but they were unable to determine if this was related to the case. Additionally fingerprints were found on Cohn's face and throat as well as the pail of milk she was carrying. Investigators also found a piece of lemon drop candy on her body that had been wet, meaning she had been eating it. However, there were no stores in Cohn's neighborhood that sold that type of candy. 20 detectives were assigned to work on the case, and the police kept close watch on the neighborhood in the days following the murder.

Charles Murray 
On May 3, 1915, four-year-old Charles Murray was strangled, stabbed to death, mutilated, and disemboweled beneath a dimly-lit staircase in his family's 270 First Avenue tenement.  After family members of his could not find him at 7:30 p.m., they searched for him and discovered his body soon afterwards. He was last seen alive playing behind the tenement earlier in the day. Murray's sister claimed to have seen a "strange" man hurry out of the building short before Murray's body was discovered, but police later dismissed this as a product of her imagination. The crime was quickly linked to the murder of Leonore Cohn. After the murder of Murray, 80 more homicide detectives for assigned to the cases, bringing the total to 100.

Moments before Murray's murder, a six-year-old girl had been attacked five doors up the street. As the girl played outside of a bakery – waiting for her aunt – she was approached by a well-dressed man with a mustache and black derby hat. When she refused to talk to the man, he grabbed arm and forced her through an open doorway. When neighbors arrived in response to the girl's screams, the assailant fled before the girl was harmed.

Letters 

Soon after the murder of Leonore Cohn, Anna Cohn began receiving letters from an individual claiming to be the perpetrator. These letters were signed "Jack the ripper," presumably referencing London's serial killer of the same alias. The letters were given to the police, who handed them to United States postal inspectors. On April 29, 27-year-old Edward Richman was arrested in connection to the letters, but soon cleared of actual involvement in the murder. One day after Richman was arrested, another letter was mailed to Cohn's mother. It read:

Inside the first envelope, there was a second envelope labeled, "Give this to the police." Inside the envelope was another letter that read:

At first, investigators suspected that Richman sent the letters to divert suspicion away from him, naming visitors who called him in jail as potential accomplices, but no evidence was ever found linking Richman to the final letters. Fingerprints were also found on the letters, but they were too blurred to be useful to those examining them.

Another letter was sent to the mother of Charles Murray after her son's murder. As she read it in her kitchen next to her friends, she collapsed in her chair. The note read:

The letter was examined, and inspectors found that it had been written with a lead pencil as opposed to the previous letters, which were written in ink. The handwriting on the envelope was also larger than on the letters to Anna Cohn.

Hysteria 
The murders caused mass hysteria in New York and the surrounding states. Locals frequently chased, beat, and threatened to lynch people they thought were the perpetrator. Others wrote copycat letters, claiming to be the perpetrator.

On May 7, 1915, a 12-year-old boy was stabbed in the thigh. As he screamed "I'm stabbed," men and women ran out into the street, shouting "He's a ripper," and chased the man accused of stabbing him. The man had to be rescued by a police officer, who kept him safe in a drugstore until a patrol car arrived. The following day, 50 people attacked a man after two boys accused him of acting suspicious. The man was rescued by the police. On May 17, a patrolman was arrested for beating his wife and child. Rumors soon spread that a "ripper" was in custody, causing 1,000 outraged locals to gather outside of the police station.

On May 9, two housewives found notes written in pencil on their doormats. The notes threatened that their children would be kidnapped and murdered the following day. Investigators traced the notes to two girls, who wrote the notes for fun. On May 12, another note from a person claiming to be the ripper was traced to an 18-year-old woman, who wrote the note to her employer out of spite.

In Newark, 100 students of Lafayette Street School chased a stranger loitering on school grounds for a mile until he was detained by a police officer. Two other people were also detained in Newark on suspicion of being the ripper that day. All three suspects were cleared.

References

External links 

1915 murders in the United States
Unsolved murders in the United States
Murder in New York City
Crimes in Manhattan
Murdered American children
Deaths by stabbing in New York (state)
1915 in New York City
Serial murders in the United States